Shurik-e Abdabad (also Romanized as Shūrīk-e ʿAbdābād) is a village in Zavarom Rural District, in the Central District of Shirvan County, North Khorasan Province, Iran. At the 2006 census, its population was 361, in 76 families.

References 

Populated places in Shirvan County